The Bredevoort witch trials took place in Bredevoort in The Netherlands in 1610.

The witch trials of 1610 started when Jenneken ter Honck of Dinxperlo was prosecuted accused of having caused the illness of life stock by use of sorcery. She confessed during torture and named Gertken op 't Goir as her accomplice. She was tortured and named accomplices in turn, which made the witch trial expand. More people, both women and men, where prosecuted, subjected to ordeal by water, tortured to confess and name accomplices, who were then also arrested. Ten men and women where executed by burning for witchcraft in Bredevoort in 1610. The Bredevoort witch trials was the perhaps last witch trial conducted by The Dutch Republic resulting in death sentences.

References 

 H.A. Hauer: in Breevoort can ick vergeten niet Uitgever: De Graafschap, 1956

Witch trials in the Netherlands
1610 in law
1610s in the Dutch Republic
17th-century executions by the Netherlands